The documented history of Islam in the Republic of Ireland dates back to the 1950s. The number of Muslims in the Republic of Ireland has increased since the 1990s, mostly through immigration. According to the 2016 Irish census, the number of Muslims resident in the Republic was 63,443 (1.26% of total population).

History
The earliest mention of Ireland in Muslim sources originates in the works of Al-Idrisi in his Tabula Rogeriana mentioned Irlandah-al-Kabirah (Great Ireland).

The organisational history of Islam in Ireland is complex, not least because of the great variety of ethnic backgrounds of Muslims in the country. The first Islamic Society in Ireland was established in 1959. It was formed by students studying in Ireland and was called the Dublin Islamic Society (later called the Islamic Foundation of Ireland). At that time there was no mosque in Dublin. The students used their homes and later rented halls for Jum'ah (Friday) and Eid (Muslim holiday) prayers. In 1976 the first mosque and Islamic centre in Ireland was opened in a four-storey building at 7 Harrington Street, Dublin 8. Among those who contributed to the cost of the mosque and Islamic centre was the late King Faisal of Saudi Arabia. In 1981 the Ministry of Endowment and Islamic Affairs of Kuwait sponsored a full-time imam for the mosque.

In 1983, the present building of the Dublin Mosque and Islamic Centre was bought, renovated and the headquarters of the Society moved from Harrington Street to 163 South Circular Road, Dublin 8.

In Cork, prayer halls are located in housing estates. Cork's Muslim community operates out of an industrial estate, while hoping to raise money to build a new mosque.

In 1992, Moosajee Bhamjee became the first (and to date only) Muslim Teachta Dála (Member of Irish Parliament).

Demography and ethnic background

According to the 2016 Irish census, there were 63,443 Muslims living in the Republic of Ireland, representing a 29% increase over the figures for the 2011 census. However the Islamic community is very much a minority, especially when compared to the numbers of Christians and those of no religion. Cities and towns with the highest Muslim population according to the 2016 census:
27,586 Dublin City and suburbs;
3,633 Cork City and suburbs;
3,432 Limerick City and suburbs;
2,047 Galway City and suburbs;
1,392 Waterford City and suburbs;
947 Balbriggan;
937 Dundalk;
937 Tralee;
861 Drogheda;
810 Portlaoise;
711 Ennis;
628 Sligo;
615 Athlone;
592 Navan;
564 Carlow;
562 Kilkenny;
550 Swords;
543 Ballyhaunis;
522 Cavan;
497 Mullingar;
489 Letterkenny;
467 Killarney;
422 Naas;
401 Longford.

The Muslim community in Ireland is diverse and growing rapidly, and its numbers are not determined by the country's history to the same extent as the UK and France, where the majority of Muslims are immigrants or descendants of immigrants from former colonies, or Germany and Austria, where the majority of Muslims are Turkish migrant workers and their descendants. Just over 55 per cent of Muslims were either Asian or African nationals with 30.7 per cent having Irish nationality. The census also revealed that of the 31,779 Muslims resident in Ireland at the time of the census, 9,761 were Irish nationals, less than the number of Asians (10,649) although more than the 6,909 African nationals. The census of 2011 found there were 49,204 Muslims in Ireland, "a sharp rise on five years previously". The Muslim immigration at the end of the 90s was caused by the Irish economic boom and asylum seekers from diverse Muslim countries, and in the 20-year period between 1991 and 2011 the Muslim population increased 1000%, from 0.1% to 1.1% of the population of the republic.

Age and sex
There was an increase in the number of Muslims in every five year age group between 2006 and 2016. There were 147 Muslim males for every 100 females in 2006. This gap narrowed to 129 males per 100 females in 2016. The average age of Muslims in 2016 was 26.0 (compared with the State average of 37.4 years). There were 10,884 children of primary school-going age (5-12 year olds) among the Muslim community in Ireland and a further 5,480 of secondary school age.

Marital status
Muslims in Ireland are more likely to be married and were less likely to be single compared with the general population. Almost 6 out of 10 were married compared with 4.8 out of 10 for the general population. Divorce is also less prevalent among Muslims compared with the general population.

Residence
Just under half (47.3%) of all of Ireland's Muslims lived in County Dublin. Dublin City was home to the largest proportion (15.5%), followed by South Dublin (13.1%), Fingal (12.8%) and Dún Laoghaire-Rathdown (5.9%).

Principal economic status
The economic status of Muslim men and women varied greatly with relatively small numbers of women at work and slightly above average numbers of men looking after the home and family.

Among Muslim men 53.3 per cent were at work in April 2016 with 17.0 per cent unemployed or looking for their first job. In contrast 23.6 per cent of Muslim women were working at the time of the census while a further 1 in 5 (19.5%) were unemployed.

In all 27.4 per cent of Muslim women aged 15 and over were looking after the home or family - significantly higher than the rate for all women at 14.9 per cent.

Major occupational groups of Muslims
There were 17,543 Muslims at work. At a broad occupational level, 'professional occupations' was the largest category, accounting for 23.5 per cent of workers. Within this category medical practitioners were the largest occupation, with 2,102 workers and accounting for 12.0 per cent of all Muslim workers compared followed by Chefs (1,349).

Mosques and denominations

In 2003, the Islamic Cultural Centre with help from Foras na Gaeilge announced plans to translate the Quran from Arabic into Irish for the first time. However, the plan foundered because of difficulties in finding speakers of both languages and as of 2018 no translation yet exists.

In September 2006 an umbrella organisation, the Irish Council of Imams, was established. It represents 14 imams in Ireland, of both the Sunni and Shia traditions. It is chaired by Imam Hussein Halawa (Islamic Cultural Centre of Ireland) and its deputy chairman is Imam Yahya Al-Hussein (Islamic Foundation of Ireland). Imam Dr. Umar Al-Qadri (Al-Mustafa Islamic Cultural Centre Dublin 15), Imam Salem (Cork Mosque), Imam Khaled (Galway Mosque) and Imam Ismael Khotwal (Blackpits Mosque) are among its founding members.

Sunni

 the Islamic Cultural Centre of Ireland in Clonskeagh, Dublin. Imam: Hussein Halawa
 the Dublin Mosque (run by the Islamic Foundation of Ireland) on the South Circular Road. Imam: Yayha Al Hussein
 Al-Mustafa Islamic Cultural Centre Ireland, or Blanchardstown mosque, Dublin 15. Imam: Dr. Umar Al-Qadri
 Muslim Association Forum, Ireland, situated at the Islamic Foundation of Ireland in Dublin and established since 1999, and acquired Charity status in 2001, as a melting pot for Muslims from African background to teach and share Islamic knowledge.
Blackpitts Mosque in the south inner city of Dublin.
Muslim Association of Ireland Executive Director: Dr. Khaled Suliman
 Turkish Irish Educational and Cultural Society Fethullah Gulen in Dublin, established in 2004
 Bray 25 Florence Road, Off Main Street, Bray, Co. Wicklow
 Dundalk Muslim Community Centre, Glenmore Park, Muirhevnamor, Dundalk, Co. Louth. Imam: Nooh Buye
 Dundalk Islamic Culture Centre, 12 Eimear Court, Market Square, Dundalk, Co. Louth. Imam: Abdulrahman Alhaddad
 Ballyhaunis Mosque, Co. Mayo was built in 1987, making it the first purpose-built Mosque in Ireland. It is a small mosque, which accommodates about one hundred and fifty worshipers. It was built by a Muslim businessman called Sher Rafique who used to own a Halal meat factory there.
 Sligo Mosque; Abbeyquarter North, Sligo. Co. Sligo. 
 Galway Mosque; Galway Islamic Centre, 13 Sandyview Drive, Riverside, Galway, Co. Galway.
 Portlaoise Mosque; Ashley House, Dublin Road, Portlaoise, Co. Laois
 Islamic Cultural Centre Killarney; Old post office, Beech Road Car Park, Beech Road, Killarney, Ireland.
 Islamic Cultural Centre Kerry; Fort Field, Killierisk, Tralee, Co. Kerry, V92 CC79. 

Prayer Halls

Al-Madinah Prayer Hall, 8 Talbot Street, Dublin 1

Royal College of Surgeons, Dublin 2.

Trinity College Dublin, Dublin 2.

Dublin City University, Dublin 9.

University College Dublin, Belfield, Dublin 4.

Islamic Information Centre - Camden Street, Dublin 2.

Blackpitts Mosque, 25-26 Blackpitts (Off South Circular Rd), Dublin 8.

Blanchardstown Masjid, Gumatti, Unit 6, Cool ports Business Park, Coolmine Industrial Estate, Blanchardstown, D15, Dublin

Dawah Community Centre, Castleknock Cross, Old Nava Road, Beechpark Ave., Castleknock, Dublin 15, Dublin

Jumma Prayer is held every week in St. Colmcille's GFC sports club in Swords, Co. Dublin at 1.30pm

Shia
Ahlul Bayt Islamic Centre (Shi'a Muslim), in Milltown, Dublin. Imam: Dr. Ali al-Saleh
Babul-Ilm Society Ireland (Azakhana e Zahra), in Unit 28, Stadium Business Park, Ballycoolin, Dublin 15
Ahlul Bayt Islamic Centre, Cork, Unit 4 Wilton West Link Park, Wilton, Cork, T12 XY02

Ahmadiyya

Ahmadiyya is generally not considered a sect of Islam in the Muslim community but they claim to be Muslims. The  Ahmadiyya Muslim Community was formally registered in the country in 1992, during the era of the Fourth Caliph. However, there have been Ahmadi Muslims in the country since the 1960s. There are two Ahmadiyya mosques in the Republic of Ireland, one in Galway City, named the Galway Mosque, and one in Lucan, Dublin. The Galway Mosque is purpose built.
Most Ahmadi Muslims in Ireland are refugees from countries where they are persecuted.

Media
Some UK-based television channels targeted at the Muslim Community can be accessed in Ireland via satellite including the Sky digital platform.

Notable Muslims
 Moosajee Bhamjee, first Muslim TD
 Rex Ingram, film director, converted to Islam in 1933
  Sinéad O'Connor, Irish traditional and pop singer who announced her conversion to Islam in October 2018

Muslim students in universities
There are several student Islamic societies in universities all across Ireland especially in the major universities such as UCD, TCD, UCC, NUIG, ISSNI, RCSI, GMIT, ITC, DCU, Dublin Institute of Technology, IT Tralee, IT Tallaght, IT Blanchardstown, DBS.

Yearly events include regular (weekly halaqas & linguistic classes), social (Food festivals), cultural (Eid), Charity drives (Charity week), physical (sports), Academic (speakers tours, lectures, courses, conferences & seminars), Intellectual (debates) and campaigns (Islam awareness & justice).

The Federation of Students Islamic societies Ireland is an umbrella organisation established in the early millennium (2003) whose mission is to unite, serve and represent Muslim students. It also seeks to bring these students together, to share experiences and to offer help and advice where appropriate, uniting Muslim Students to positively contribute to Irish communities.

See also
Islam in Northern Ireland
Religion in the Republic of Ireland

References

External links

Islamic Foundation Of Ireland
Islamic Cultural Centre of Ireland
Irish Islamic Chamber of Commerce 

 
Ireland